The SMS Ranches are a famous group of cattle ranches located in West Texas.

Background
Swante M. Swenson migrated to America from Sweden during 1836. In 1850 Swenson moved to Austin, Texas and established a mercantile business with his uncle Swante Palm. While running the business, Swenson continued to buy railroad land and then bought school scripts to acquire additional property. In 1854 Svenson invested in the Buffalo Bayou, Brazos and Colorado Railway, which gained him acres of land in northwestern and western Texas.

SMS Ranches eventually became one of the largest landowners in Texas. The ranches were named for the initials of the founder, Swante M. Swenson. The SMS brand, consisting of an extended M sandwiched between two reversed S's, was registered by the Swensons in the spring of 1882. At one time most, if not all, foremen of the SMS Ranches were immigrant Swedes. Swenson leased his holdings to his sons, who operated them under the name of Swenson Brothers Cattle Company from headquarters in Stamford, Texas.

Ranching Units
Throckmorton Ranch - located in Throckmorton County 
Flat Top Ranch -   located in Jones County, Stonewall County, and Haskell County 
Ericsdahl Ranch - located in Jones County and Haskell County 
Tongue River Ranch  - located in Cottle County, King County, Motley County, and Dickens County
Ellerslie Ranch - located in Jones County and Haskell County

References

Primary sources
Clark,  Mary Whatley The Swenson Saga and the SMS Ranches (Austin, Texas: Jenkins Book Publishing Co. 1976)
Swenson, Gail  S. M. Swenson and the Development of the SMS Ranches (University of Texas, 1960)
Hastings, Frank S  The Story of the SMS Ranch (S. M. Swenson & Sons. 1922)
 Anderson, August Hyphenated, or The Life Story of S. M. Swenson (Austin: Steck, 1916)

External links
Swenson Land and Cattle Company: Inventory of Records, 1846-1927
Swenson Land & Cattle Company Gallery
SMS Ranches, Texas

Ranches in Texas
Companies based in Texas
1854 establishments in Texas
Companies established in 1854